Destroyer is the fifth studio album by the Canadian psychedelic rock band, Black Mountain. It was released on May 24, 2019, by Dine Alone Records and was the band's first new material in three years after their fourth album, IV.

Destroyer is the first album with Rachel Fannan (from Sleepy Sun) and Adam Bulgasem (from Dommengang and Soft Kill).

Background 
The album was first announced on March 7, 2019, with the release of a single, "Future Shade", described by the lead singer, Stephen McBean, as a "warping" and "rending". McBean described the riff as one that has "traveled around the world then hit the bong with a chorus a year and a half later. A last attempt at double frosting produced a chorus on chorus death match. Anxiety is the new heavy metal."

The album takes its name from discontinued single-run 1985 Dodge Destroyer. The album also refers to the fact that McBean obtained his driver's license in 2017.

Destroyer has contributions from The Flaming Lips' Kliph Scurlock and Oneida's Kid Millions.

Style and composition 
Destroyer has been described as having a mixture of stoner rock, progressive rock, hard rock, neo-psychedelia and space rock.

Promotion

Singles 
Three singles were released before Destroyer. The first single, "Future Shade", was released on March 7, 2019. "Boogie Lover" came out on April 11, 2019, and "Licensed to Drive" on May 8, 2019.

David Nadelle of Tiny Mix Tapes described "Boogie Lover" as a "bevy of heavy friends both old and new", referring to the appearances by Jeremy Schmidt, Kliph Scurlock (The Flaming Lips), Kid Millions (Oneida), Rachel Fannan (Sleepy Sun) and Adam Bulgasem (Dommengang). Chris DeVille of Stereogum called the song "a spacey, doomy slow creep on which the band sounds as towering and geological as their band name suggests".

Also writing for Stereogum, Tom Breihan praised "Licensed to Drive", saying the track "starts out with eerie horror-movie theatrics, locks into ’70s-style dragon-trudge metal, and climaxes with a wild Edgar Winter-ish synth solo. It's flaming-sword music, music for blasting off into the cosmos on a tricked-out GTO."

Critical reception 

Destroyer was well received by contemporary music critics. At the review aggregator website, Metacritic, the album has an average rating of 74 out of 100 based on ten critic reviews indicating generally favorable reviews.

Track listing

Charts

References 

2019 albums
Albums produced by John Congleton
Black Mountain (band) albums
Dine Alone Records albums